The men's +100 kg competition at the 2020 European Judo Championships was held on 21 November at the O2 Arena.

Results

Final

Repechage

Top half

Bottom half

References

External links
 

M101
European Judo Championships Men's Heavyweight